Francis Dolan Collins (March 5, 1841 – November 21, 1891) was an American lawyer and politician who was a two-term Democratic member of the U.S. House of Representatives for Pennsylvania's 11th congressional district from 1875 to 1879.

Early life and education
Francis Collins was born in Saugerties, New York, to Thomas and Catherine Collins. He attended St. Joseph's College, near Montrose, Pennsylvania, before moving with his parents to Dunmore, Pennsylvania. He attended Wyoming Seminary in Kingston, Pennsylvania.

He studied law, was admitted to the bar in 1866 and commenced practice in Scranton, Pennsylvania.

Career
He was elected district attorney of the mayor's court district in 1869. He served in the Pennsylvania State Senate for the 13th district from 1872 to 1874.

Collins was elected as a Democrat to the Forty-fourth and Forty-fifth Congresses.

Later career and death 
He resumed the practice of his profession and died in Scranton in 1891, aged 50. He was interred in Cathedral Cemetery in Scranton, Pennsylvania.

References

External links

|-

1841 births
1891 deaths
19th-century American politicians
Burials in Pennsylvania
Pennsylvania lawyers
Democratic Party members of the United States House of Representatives from Pennsylvania
Democratic Party Pennsylvania state senators
People from Kingston, Pennsylvania
People from Saugerties, New York
Politicians from Scranton, Pennsylvania
Wyoming Seminary alumni
19th-century American lawyers